Simon Cziommer (born 6 November 1980) is a German former professional footballer who played as a midfielder.

Career
Since he joined FC Twente in 1999 he scored 28 goals for various clubs. He played in UEFA Cup and UEFA Champions League games, the latter with his former club FC Schalke 04. A goalscoring attacking midfielder, Cziommer is known as a good dribbler.

He was signed by AZ Alkmaar from Schalke 04 just before the start of the 2006–07 season. In the 2008–09 season, he played on loan with FC Utrecht from AZ and signed on 22 June 2009 to FC Red Bull Salzburg where he played until 2012.

On 31 July 2012, Cziommer signed a one-year contract with Vitesse Arnhem from the Eredivisie. After he had been released by Vitesse Arnhem, he trained for a while with his former team AZ. On 2 September 2013, he was signed by Heracles Almelo to be the successor of Lerin Duarte, who had been sold to Ajax.

On 31 August 2015, Cziommer reportedly signed a contract with amateur outfit , a student association based in Leiden. Although the news was published and shared by several national media, and retweeted by several Dutch football clubs, the students soon released a statement, confessing Cziommer's move had been a joke.

Post-playing career
On 14 October 2015, Cziommer announced he had definitely retired from professional football, after not being able to find a club of his approval. 

Cziommer speaks Dutch fluently and lives in Laren, North Holland. After his football career, he became a player's agent at Stars & Friends.

Honours
Schalke 04
UEFA Intertoto Cup: 2003

Red Bull Salzburg
Austrian Football Bundesliga: 2009–10, 2011–12
Austrian Cup: 2011–12

References

External links
 
 Voetbal International profile 

1980 births
Living people
People from Nordhorn
German footballers
Footballers from Lower Saxony
Association football midfielders
Germany B international footballers
Bundesliga players
Eredivisie players
Austrian Football Bundesliga players
FC Twente players
FC Schalke 04 players
Roda JC Kerkrade players
AZ Alkmaar players
FC Utrecht players
FC Red Bull Salzburg players
SBV Vitesse players
Heracles Almelo players
German expatriate footballers
German expatriate sportspeople in the Netherlands
Expatriate footballers in the Netherlands
German expatriate sportspeople in Austria
Expatriate footballers in Austria